Emmanuel Jones (born June 6, 1999) is an American football defensive tackle for the Arizona Cardinals of the National Football League (NFL). He played college football at Colorado State and was signed by the Cardinals as an undrafted free agent in 2022.

Professional career
After going unselected in the 2022 NFL Draft, the Arizona Cardinals signed Jones as an undrafted free agent. He was waived at the final roster cuts, on August 30, 2022, and signed to the Cardinals' practice squad the next day.

Jones was elevated to the team's active roster on November 5. He made his professional debut the next day against the Seattle Seahawks in the team's week 9 game He was placed back on the practice squad on November 7. Jones was again elevated to the main roster, playing in the team's week 15 game before being placed back in the practice squad. He was elevated for the final time on December 28, playing in the Cardinals' week 17 and 18 games. Jones played, in total, four games for the Cardinals in 2022.

References

External links
 Arizona Cardinals bio
 Colorado State Rams bio
 Collegiate statisitcs at Sports-Reference.com

1999 births
Living people
American football defensive tackles
Players of American football from Georgia (U.S. state)
Colorado State Rams football players
Arizona Cardinals players
People from Cartersville, Georgia